Twin Peaks: Limited Event Series Original Soundtrack is a soundtrack album by American composer Angelo Badalamenti. It was released on September 8, 2017, by Rhino Entertainment. The album is the score to the Twin Peaks revival series, and includes previously unreleased compositions by Badalamenti.

An additional soundtrack, which featured music performed and featured diegetically on the revival series, was concurrently released as Twin Peaks: Music from the Limited Event Series.

Track listing

Personnel
Credits adapted from the liner notes of Twin Peaks: Limited Event Series Original Soundtrack.

 Angelo Badalamenti – executive production
 Mike Bozzi – mastering
 Jim Bruening – score co-production
 Stacy Conde – project supervision
 Jason Day – project supervision
 Kate Dear – art direction
 Dean Hurley – album assembly, music supervision
 David Lynch – cover, design, executive production
 Suzanne Tenner – photography

Charts

References

2017 soundtrack albums
Albums produced by Angelo Badalamenti
Albums produced by David Lynch
Music of Twin Peaks
Rhino Entertainment soundtracks
Twin Peaks
Angelo Badalamenti soundtracks